Emerle is a surname. Notable people with the surname include:

Colin Emerle (born 1979), American musician
Justin Emerle (born 1976), American musician, brother of Colin

See also
Eberle